Glyphopeltis is a genus in the family Psoraceae. It is monotypic, consisting of the single saxicolous lichen species Glyphopeltis eburina, found in southern Africa. This species was formally described as a new species in 1985 by Franklin Brusse, who discovered the type specimen growing on the shaded lower surface of a dolerite boulder in Cape Province.

References

Lecanorales
Lichen genera
Lecanorales genera
Taxa described in 1985